The 2010 Siemens Open was a professional tennis tournament played on outdoor red clay courts. This was the eleventh edition of the tournament, now called The Hague Open, which is part of the Tretorn SERIE+ of the 2010 ATP Challenger Tour. It took place in Scheveningen, Netherlands between 5 July and 11 July 2010.

ATP entrants

Seeds

 Rankings are as of June 21, 2010.

Other entrants
The following players received wildcards into the singles main draw:
  Justin Eleveld
  Stephan Fransen
  Jannick Lupescu
  Thomas Schoorel

The following players received entry from the qualifying draw:
  André Ghem
  Rameez Junaid (as a Lucky Loser)
  Morgan Phillips (as a Lucky Loser)
  Nicolas Renavand
  Jasper Smit
  Jan-Lennard Struff

Champions

Singles

 Denis Gremelmayr def.  Thomas Schoorel 7–5, 6–4

Doubles

 Franco Ferreiro /  Harsh Mankad def.  Rameez Junaid /  Philipp Marx 6–4, 3–6, [10–7]

References
Official website
ITF Search 

Siemens Open
Tretorn SERIE+ tournaments
Clay court tennis tournaments
The Hague Open
2010 in Dutch tennis

it:Siemens Open
nl:Mets tennisbanen